Bachelor's Hope is a historic home located at Chaptico, St. Mary's County, Maryland.  It is known for the two-story brick central block with a jerkinhead roof, which contains one large ground-floor room. On either side are one-story, two-room brick wings. No other known 18th century structure in the state exists with a similar combination of the "Great Hall" plan, facade, and component features.

It was listed on the National Register of Historic Places in 1972.

References

External links
, including photo from 1971, at Maryland Historical Trust

Houses on the National Register of Historic Places in Maryland
Houses in St. Mary's County, Maryland
Historic American Buildings Survey in Maryland
National Register of Historic Places in St. Mary's County, Maryland